Richard B. Russell Lake (known to locals as simply "Lake Russell") is a reservoir created by the U.S. Army Corps of Engineers by construction of Richard B. Russell Dam on the Savannah River bordering Elbert County, Georgia and Abbeville and Anderson counties in South Carolina. The lake impounds primarily the Savannah River but also includes Beaverdam Creek on the Georgia side and Rocky River on the South Carolina side. This causes the lake to always look full.

Unlike its neighbors Lake Hartwell to the north and Lake Strom Thurmond to the south, federal regulations prohibit private use of the public lands surrounding Lake Russell.

Archaeology
The area flooded by the lake covered several areas of archaeological significance.  There was a significant effort to explore and excavate these sites before filling the lake.  Sites include Millwood Plantation, Fort Independence and a Native American village and mound.

The lake also covered the historic Georgia-Carolina Memorial Bridge which was not demolished but remains intact beneath the lake.

Recreation
Since it was constructed after 1974, the Corps of Engineers prohibits exclusive private use of the lake's shoreline. As a result, the shoreline of the lake is almost completely undeveloped with the exception of some state parks and day-use areas. The natural shoreline creates a strikingly different feel and look to the lake when compared to Thurmond and Hartwell which have highly developed shorelines.

See also
List of lakes in South Carolina
Lake Hartwell
Lake Strom Thurmond

References

External links

Protected areas of Abbeville County, South Carolina
Protected areas of Anderson County, South Carolina
Protected areas of Elbert County, Georgia
Reservoirs in Georgia (U.S. state)
Reservoirs in South Carolina
Bodies of water of Abbeville County, South Carolina
Bodies of water of Anderson County, South Carolina
Bodies of water of Elbert County, Georgia